The Sultanate of Singora was a heavily fortified port city in southern Thailand and the precursor of the present-day town of Songkhla. It was founded in the early 17th century by a Persian, Dato Mogol, and flourished during the reign of his son, Sultan Sulaiman Shah. In 1680, after decades of conflict, the city was destroyed and abandoned; remains include forts, city walls, a Dutch cemetery and the tomb of Sultan Sulaiman Shah. An inscribed cannon from Singora bearing the seal of Sultan Sulaiman Shah is displayed next to the flagpole at the Royal Hospital Chelsea, London.

The sultanate's history was documented in accounts, letters and journals written by British and Dutch East India Company traders; its destruction was discussed in books and reports authored by representatives of the French embassies to Siam in the mid 1680s. Sultan Sulaiman's family history has also been chronicled: Princess Sri Sulalai, a consort of King Rama II and mother of King Rama III, was descended from Sultan Sulaiman; present-day descendants include the 22nd Prime Minister of Thailand and a former Navy admiral. Sources pertaining to the Singora cannon include articles published in academic journals and letters written by General Sir Harry Prendergast, commander of the Burma Expeditionary Force that captured Mandalay in the third Anglo-Burmese War.

History

Early history

The Sultanate of Singora, sometimes known as Songkhla at Khao Daeng, was a port city in the deep south of Thailand and precursor of the present-day town of Songkhla. It was located near the southern tip of the Sathing Phra peninsula, on and around the foothills of Khao Daeng Mountain in Singha Nakhon. British and Dutch East India Company traders called the city Sangora; Japanese officials knew it as Shinichu; contemporary French writers used the names Singor, Cingor and Soncourat.

Singora was founded in the early 17th century by Dato Mogol, a Persian Malay-Muslim who accepted Siamese suzerainty and paid tribute to the Kingdom of Ayutthaya. The port was said to be ideal and able to accommodate more than 80 large vessels; a network of overland and riverine routes expedited trans-peninsular trade with the Sultanate of Kedah. Jeremias van Vliet, Director of the Dutch East India Company's trading post in Ayuthaya, described Singora as one of Siam's principal cities and a major exporter of pepper; French traveller and gem merchant John Baptista Tavernier wrote about the city's abundant tin mines. A Cottonian manuscript at the British Library discusses Singora's duty-free policy and viability as a hub for regional trade:

Dato Mogol died in 1620 and was succeeded by his eldest son, Sulaiman. A period of turmoil erupted ten years later when the Queen of Pattani branded the new ruler of Siam, King Prasat Thong, a usurper and tyrant. The queen withheld tribute and ordered attacks on Ligor (present-day Nakhon Si Thammarat) and Bordelongh (present-day Phatthalung); Ayuthaya responded by blockading Pattani with an army of 60,000 men, as well as enlisting the help of the Dutch people in capturing the City. Singora became involved in the dispute and in 1633 sent an envoy to Ayuthaya requesting help. The outcome of this request is not known, but Dutch records show that Singora was severely damaged and the pepper crop destroyed.

Independence
In December 1641 Jeremias van Vliet left Ayuthaya and sailed to Batavia. He stopped en route at Singora in February 1642 and presented Sulaiman with a letter of introduction from the Phra Khlang (known by the Dutch as the Berckelangh), the Siamese official responsible for foreign affairs. Sulaiman's response sheds light on his attitude towards suzerainty:

Later that year Sulaiman declared independence from Ayuthaya and appointed himself Sultan Sulaiman Shah. He modernised the port, ordered the construction of city walls and moats, and built a network of forts that spanned the harbour to the summit of Khao Daeng. Trade flourished: the city was frequented by Dutch and Portuguese merchants and enjoyed amicable relations with Chinese traders. Ayuthaya tried at least three times to reclaim Singora during Sulaiman's reign; each attack failed. One naval campaign ended in ignominy when the Siamese admiral abandoned his post. To help fend off overland assaults, Sulaiman assigned his brother, Pharisees, to strengthen the nearby town of Chai Buri in Phatthalung.

Sultan Sulaiman died in 1668 and was succeeded by his eldest son, Mustapha. A war with Pattani broke out soon after, but despite being outnumbered more than four to one, Singora rejected attempts at mediation by the Sultan of Kedah and trusted in its army of experienced soldiers and cannoneers. During the late 1670s Greek adventurer Constance Phaulkon arrived in Siam. He sailed to the country from Java on a British East India Company vessel and, heeding orders from his employer, promptly embarked on a mission to smuggle arms to Singora. His escapade ended in failure when he was shipwrecked.

Destruction

In 1679 Ayuthaya mounted a final offensive to quash the Singora rebellion. Samuel Potts, a British East India Company trader based in Singora, recorded the city's preparations for war:

In a letter dated August 1679 Potts informed his East India Company colleague that the Siamese fleet had arrived and stressed the impending danger. The events that followed were decisive: in 1680, after a siege lasting more than six months, Singora was destroyed and abandoned. Contemporary French sources document the city's destruction and provide a wealth of detail. The head of the French East India Company's operations in Ayuthaya described how Singora's "trés bonne citadelle" had been razed after a war of more than thirty years; a missionary working in Ayuthaya in the mid 1680s told how the King of Siam sent his finest ships to destroy the sultanate "de fond en comble" (from top to bottom). Simon de la Loubère, France's envoy to Siam in 1687, recounted a story about a French cannoneer who crept into the city one night and single-handedly captured the sultan:

While Loubère's account of life in 17th-century Siam was well received by his contemporaries in France, the veracity of his tale about Cyprian and Singora's demise has been questioned. An article published in the Journal of the Royal Asiatic Society of Great Britain and Ireland, for example, described it as "a story which might have passed in a romantic age, but it is too improbable for history". In a memo dated 1685 a French East India Company official claimed that Singora was finally captured by means of a ruse. Thailand's Ministry of Culture supports this version of events and discusses a spy who tricked his way into the city, enabling Siamese troops to enter and burn it to the ground.

Cession to France
In 1685 Siam attempted to cede Singora to France: the hope was that the French East India Company, supported by a garrison of troops, could rebuild the city, establish a trading post and counter the strong regional Dutch influence. The city was offered to France's envoy to Siam, the Chevalier de Chaumont, and a provisional treaty signed in December; Siamese ambassador Kosa Pan sailed to France the following year to ratify the cession. The French, however, were not interested: Secretary of State for the Navy, the Marquis de Seignelay, told Kosa Pan that Singora was ruined and of no further use, and asked for a trading post in Bangkok instead.

Landmarks

After Singora had been destroyed, Sultan Sulaiman's sons were pardoned and assigned to new positions in Siam. Later generations of Sultan Sulaiman's family were closely connected with Siamese royalty: two of Sulaiman's descendants commanded armed forces led by Prince Surasi in the 1786 conquest of Pattani; Princess Sri Sulalai, a consort of King Rama II and mother of King Rama III, was also descended from Sultan Sulaiman. Present-day descendants include Admiral Niphon Sirithorn, a former Commander-in-Chief of the Royal Thai Navy General Chavalit Yongchaiyudh, the 22nd Prime Minister of Thailand; and a family of silk weavers at the Muslim village of Phumriang in Surat Thani.

The forts at Khao Daeng
Thailand's Ministry of Culture details the remains of fourteen forts on and around Khao Daeng Mountain. Forts 4, 8 and 9 are well preserved and characterise the sultanate's military architecture: fort 4 can be reached by ascending a flight of steps that starts behind the archaeological information centre, fort 8 is accessible via a stairway near the Sultan Sulaiman Shah mosque, fort 9 sits atop a small motte near the main road leading from Singha Nakhon to Ko Yo Island. Forts 5 and 6 occupy the upper slopes of the mountain and offer panoramic views of Lake Songkhla and the Gulf of Thailand. The two pagodas on the summit of Khao Daeng were built on the base of fort 10 during the 1830s to commemorate the suppression of rebellions in Kedah.

In her book In the Land of Lady White Blood: Southern Thailand and the Meaning of History, Lorraine Gesick discussed a manuscript from Wat Pha Kho in Sathing Phra. The manuscript (which in Gesick's opinion dates from the late 17th century) consists mainly of an illustrated map about ten metres long that depicts Sultan Sulaiman's forts at Khao Daeng. A microfilm of this manuscript, made by American historian David Wyatt, is kept at the Cornell University Library.

The tomb of Sultan Sulaiman Shah
The cemetery is mentioned in the Sejarah Kerajaan Melayu Patani (History of the Malay Kingdom of Patani), a Javi account drawn mostly from the Hikayat Patani. The text describes Sultan Sulaiman as a Muslim raja who died in battle and the cemetery as "full of nothing but jungle". The tomb is an object of pilgrimage in the deep south of Thailand, where Sultan Sulaiman is revered by Muslims and Buddhists alike.

The Dutch cemetery
About  from the tomb of Sultan Sulaiman is a Dutch cemetery known locally as the Vilanda Graveyard. The cemetery is located within the grounds of a PTT petroleum complex; permission is needed to gain access. In 1998 an investigation of the cemetery was conducted using ground-penetrating radar. The survey yielded detailed radargrams showing subsurface lime coffins that belonged to Singora's 17th-century Dutch community. A paper discussing these findings was presented to the IV meeting of the Environmental and Engineering Geophysical Society in Barcelona, September 1998.

The Singora cannon

Following Singora's destruction, Siamese troops seized and sent to Ayuthaya an inscribed cannon.  The cannon remained there until it was captured during the Burmese-Siamese war of 1765–1767 and transported to Burma. It was then taken by the British in the third Anglo-Burmese War (1885–1887) and shipped to England. In 1887 it was presented to the Royal Hospital Chelsea in London and put on display next to the flagpole in the grounds of the Figure Court. The cannon bears eleven inscriptions, nine of which have been carved in Arabic characters and inlaid with silver. One inscription refers to the engraver, Tun Juma'at Abu Mandus of Singora; another is set within a circular arabesque design and reads "The seal of Sultan Sulaiman Shah, the Victorious King".

Sources pertaining to the Singora cannon's journey to London include the Hmannan Yazawin (the first official chronicle of Burma's Konbaung Dynasty) and reports written by General Sir Harry Prendergast, commander of the Burma Expeditionary Force that captured Mandalay in the third Anglo-Burmese war. The Hmannan Yazawin provides an inventory of weapons taken by the Burmese after the sack of Ayuthaya, noting that most guns were destroyed and only the finest pieces conveyed to Burma. Correspondence between General Prendergast and his superiors in India details ordnance seized during the Burma campaign and lists cannon sent as presents to Queen Victoria, the Viceroy of India, British governors of Madras and Bombay, the Royal Naval College in Greenwich, Portsmouth and Plymouth dockyards, and the Royal Hospital Chelsea. A letter at the Royal Hospital refers to the Singora cannon as a Burmese trophy gun received from the Government of India in October 1887.

Notes
Historical sources

 The manuscript A Letter of Instructions from the East Indian Company to its Agent, Circ. 1614 is part of the British Library's Cottonian collection, reference Otho E. VIII ff. 231–240.
 The quote from Dutch Papers: Extracts from the "Dagh Register" 1624–1642 was translated into English from Dagh-Register Gehouden int Casteel Batavia 1641–1642. The quoted passage (in Dutch) is on page 154.
 Samuel Potts' letters from Singora to his East India Company colleagues in Ayuthaya are bundled together in Syam Coppy Booke of Letters Received from Severall Places, part of the British Library's Factory Records: Siam (1678–1683) collection, reference IOR/G/33/1 ff.1–18.
 The French memo discussing Singora's destruction and the ruse employed by Siamese troops is titled Lettre de Veret aux Directeurs de la Compagnie (12 Décembre 1685) and kept at the Archives Nationales d'Outre-Mer, France.
 General Prendergast's list of cannon intended as presents for British royalty, senior officers and military establishments is part of the British Library's Proceedings of the Government of India Military Department: Burma 1885–86, reference IOR/L/MIL/17/19/30. A summary of ordnance captured during the Burma campaign (including 158 brass or bronze cannon taken from Mandalay Palace) was published in The London Gazette, 22 June 1886.

Miscellaneous notes

Citations

Sources

Vajiranana National Library, Bangkok

PhD theses

Books and monographs

 

  

Journal of the Siam Society

 

Journals of the Royal Asiatic Society

Other journals

Websites: Ministry of Culture, Thailand

Websites: other

1605 establishments in Thailand
Former countries in Thai history
Former sultanates
Songkhla province
Archaeological sites in Thailand
Former countries